John Patrick Page (born April 27, 1962) is an American actor, low bass singer, and playwright. He originated the roles of Norman Osborn/Green Goblin in Spider-Man: Turn Off the Dark, the Grinch in Dr. Seuss' How the Grinch Stole Christmas! The Musical, and Hades in Hadestown. He also played Menenius in Red Bull Theater's Coriolanus.

Early life
John Patrick Page was born in Spokane, Washington, and raised primarily in Monmouth, Oregon. His father, Robert Page, was a theatre educator at Western Oregon University (then named Oregon College of Education). Page's early love of Shakespeare took hold when his father performed with the Oregon Shakespeare Festival in Ashland, Oregon, in 1964–1965. His mother, Geri, was an administrator at Oregon State University. Patrick has two brothers, Robert and Michael, and one sister, Gayle. 

In his teens, he developed an interest in magic and illusion. In 1978 he won the Pacific Coast Association of Magicians Stage Competition and in 1979 he was chosen by the International Brotherhood of Magicians as the Outstanding Teenage Magician in the stage-magic category.

Education
Page attended Central High School in Independence, Oregon, graduating in 1980. During high school, Page was active not only in theater, but also in speech and debate tournaments and became the first person to win the national championship title twice, as the National Forensics League's Speaker of the Year in both 1979 and 1980. Next, he attended The Pacific Conservatory of Performing Arts. He then graduated cum laude from Whitman College in 1985 and was chosen as the valedictory speaker for his class. During his time at Whitman, Page was twice chosen as the Outstanding Competitive Speaker in the Nation by the American Forensics Association, leading the Whitman team to an overall second-place finish at Nationals.

Career
Page's early career was spent primarily in Utah and Oregon. Page spent six seasons with the Utah Shakespeare Festival in Cedar City, becoming a Resident Artist and the Director of Development, during which time he helped oversee the creation of the new Randall L. Jones Theatre. During the off-season he frequently performed with the Pioneer Theatre Company in Salt Lake City. Subsequently, he spent several seasons with the Oregon Shakespeare Festival in Ashland, before branching out to other regional theatres and eventually moving to New York.

Page's Broadway credits include originating the role of The Grinch in Dr. Seuss' How the Grinch Stole Christmas!, Scar in The Lion King, Lumière in Disney's Beauty and the Beast in the U.S. National Tour, Ebenezer Scrooge and Jacob Marley in A Christmas Carol at Madison Square Garden, Decius Brutus in Julius Caesar (opposite Denzel Washington), and multiple roles in The Kentucky Cycle. His performance as King Henry VIII (opposite Frank Langella) in the Broadway revival of A Man for All Seasons in 2008 was nominated for the Outer Critics Award and chosen by The Wall Street Journal as one of the outstanding theatre performances of that year.

Off-Broadway, he has been seen in Richard II, Rex, and The Duchess of Malfi. Page is also widely recognized as one of America's leading classical actors. He is an Affiliate Artist of the Shakespeare Theatre Company in Washington, D.C., and an Artist in Residence at the Old Globe Theatre in San Diego. As a member of the Shakespeare Theatre Company, he, along with other company members, received the William Shakespeare Award for Classical Theatre (Will Award) in 2007. In 2006 Page was awarded the Helen Hayes Award for Outstanding Leading Performance by an Actor for his portrayal of Iago in Michael Kahn's production of Othello at The Shakespeare Theatre. Washington Post critic Peter Marks cited Page's Iago as one of five outstanding American performances of Shakespeare in his lifetime, along with Stacy Keach, Liev Schreiber, Kevin Kline, and Michael Hayden. Page's other performances at STC include the title role in Macbeth (opposite Kelly McGillis) and Claudius in Hamlet. He is currently starring in the title role of King Lear through April 8th, 2023.

At the Old Globe Theatre in San Diego, Page's performance in the title role of Cyrano De Bergerac won the Craig Noel, San Diego Critics, and Patte Awards for Outstanding Leading Actor in a Play. He has also been seen at the Globe as Malvolio in Twelfth Night, Pogo Poole in The Pleasure of His Company, and Geoffrey Cordova in Dancing in the Dark (aka The Band Wagon) for which he also received the Craig Noel Award. Page has performed at many of America's leading regional theatres. His classical performances include Cyrano, Sergius, Hamlet, Richard II, Richard III, Oberon, Henry V, Talbot, Pinch, Armado, Mercutio, Brutus, Antony, Dr. Caius, Autolycus, Pandarus, Brazen, Hortensio, Malvolio, Horatio, Claudius, Iago, Jaques, Macbeth, and Benedick. Page is also a playwright. In 2004 his play Swansong debuted at the Lucille Lortel White Barn Theatre in Norwalk, Connecticut, and was named one of the top ten plays of the year by the American Theatre Critics Association. It later played at the Kennedy Center, the Seattle Shakespeare Company, and Off-Broadway on Theatre Row.

Page is also the author of the one-man shows Passion's Slaves and Love Will, and the co-author (with Doug Christensen and Larry Baker) of Nothing Like the Sun. Page authored a popular stage adaptation of A Christmas Carol. Page is also an acting teacher who has worked at NYU's Tisch Graduate School of the Arts, the Old Globe's MFA program, the Alabama Shakespeare Festival's MFA program, Southern Utah University, and many others. He now teaches privately in New York City. He has directed Macbeth, Romeo and Juliet, A Midsummer Night's Dream, Measure for Measure, Twelfth Night, and many more.

Page created the dual role of Norman Osborn and his alter ego the Green Goblin in Julie Taymor's Broadway rock musical Spider-Man: Turn Off the Dark, which played at the Foxwoods Theatre until January 2014. Premiering in June 2011, it featured music and lyrics by Bono and The Edge. Page's performance received positive reviews and was quoted as being one of the main reasons to see the show. For this performance, he received a nomination for the Drama Desk Award for Outstanding Featured Actor in a Musical. Page left the show on August 5, 2012, to star in the new Broadway production of Cyrano De Bergerac which ran for a limited engagement from September to November 2012. His role in Spider-Man was taken over by Robert Cuccioli.

Page played the title role in Shakespeare Theatre Company's Coriolanus from March to June 2013.

Page appeared in the Broadway production of John Grisham's A Time to Kill. The production started on September 28, 2013, and officially opened on October 20, 2013. He appeared in the new play Casa Valentina, which opened on Broadway in April 2014. He originated the role of Frollo in the U.S. premiere of The Hunchback of Notre Dame, made his Shakespeare in the Park debut in Cymbeline, and in fall 2015 played Adult Men in the Spring Awakening revival produced by Deaf West and directed by his Hunchback co-star Michael Arden.

Page played Hades in productions of Hadestown at the New York Theatre Workshop, at the Citadel Theatre in Edmonton, and at London's Royal National Theatre. He reprised the role on Broadway at the Walter Kerr Theatre beginning in March 2019, receiving a nomination for the Tony Award for Best Featured Actor in a Musical. The role features Page singing as low as a G1, which is one of the lowest notes playable on a piano. On November 2, 2022, it was announced that Page would be exiting Hadestown on December 30, after six years in the role.

Personal life
He was married to actress Liisa Ivary from 1989 to 1991. In 2001, he married actress and TV personality Paige Davis (TLC's Trading Spaces, Broadway's Chicago and Boeing-Boeing). The Pages said in 2009: "We've been a couple for 14 years and married for eight of them..."

He has been an outspoken advocate for mental-health awareness and has spoken publicly about his lifelong experience with deep depression, which he now manages with medication: "It took a long time to get my medications right. I have variously been diagnosed with an anxiety disorder, bipolar disorder, depressive disorder—you name it. It takes constant vigilance to keep up with my sneaky serotonin levels. And—full disclosure—there were years of dangerous substance abuse as I attempted to self-medicate my symptoms."

Filmography

Film

Television

Theatre

Podcasts

Awards and nominations
Page has received a variety of awards and accolades throughout his career, including a Grammy Award, a Helen Hayes Award, a Princess Grace Award, an Emery Battis Award, the Utah Governors Medal for the Arts, the Whitman College Young Alumni Award, the Craig Noel Award, and the Joseph Jefferson Award, as well as having received a Tony Award nomination.

References

External links

 Official Site
 
  
 Feature article at Playbill.com

1962 births
American male film actors
American male television actors
American male voice actors
American male musical theatre actors
American male stage actors
20th-century American male actors
21st-century American male actors
Grammy Award winners
Living people
Male actors from Oregon
People from Independence, Oregon
People from Monmouth, Oregon
Princess Grace Awards winners
Whitman College alumni